Mandeep or Mandip is a given name. It means "enlightened", "mind full of light", "light of the mind", or "light of heart and mind".

Notable people
Notable people with the given name include:
Mandeep Antil (born 1989), Indian field hockey player
Mandeep Benipal, Indian film director
Mandeep Dhillon (born 1990), British actress
Mandeep Jangra (born 1993), Indian amateur boxer
Mandeep Kaur (athlete) (born 1988), Indian athlete 
Mandeep Kaur (cricketer) (born 1988), Indian cricketer
Mandeep R. Mehra (born 1964), professor at Harvard Medical School
Mandeep Roy, Indian film actor
Mandeep Singh (born 1991), Indian cricketer
Mandeep Singh (field hockey) (born 1995), Indian field hockey player
Mandip Gill (born 1988), English actress
Mandip Sehmi (born 1980), British wheelchair rugby player
Mandip Singh Soin (born 1957), Indian mountaineer

References

Hindu given names
Indian given names
Sikh names